The 1972 Kansas Jayhawks football team represented the University of Kansas in the Big Eight Conference during the 1972 NCAA University Division football season. In their second season under head coach Don Fambrough, the Jayhawks compiled a 4–7 record (2–5 against conference opponents), finished in seventh place in the conference, and were outscored by opponents by a combined total of 305 to 208. They played their home games at Memorial Stadium in Lawrence, Kansas.

The team's statistical leaders included David Jaynes with 2,253 passing yards, Jerome Nellums with 684 rushing yards and Bruce Adams with 704 receiving yards. Don Perkins and Pat Ryan were the team captains.

Schedule

References

Kansas
Kansas Jayhawks football seasons
Kansas Jayhawks football